Arabi Malayalam (also called Mappila Malayalam and Moplah Malayalam) is the traditional Dravidian language of the Mappila Muslim community. It is spoken by several thousand people, predominantly in the Malabar Coast of Kerala state, southern India. The form can be classified as a regional dialect in northern Kerala, or as a class or occupational dialect of the Mappila community. It can also be called a vernacular in general, or as a provincial patois, with the latter label being increasingly applicable in Colonial times. All the forms of the Malayalam language, including Mappila, are mutually intelligible.

The Mappila form shows some lexical admixture from Arabic and Persian.

The variety Arabi Malayalam is also used by lower caste non-Muslims in northern Kerala, Muslims in Dakshina Kannada, and different Mappila migrant communities in South East Asia.

Writing system 

The Arabi Malayalam script is an Abjad. The script is also known as Khatafunnani or Ponnani script. It is also used to write several minority languages such as Eranadan and Jesri.

Arabi Malayalam was made by writing Malayalam while using the Arabic script. The language of Malayalam was mainly used to spread the ideas and practices of Islam in Kerala. Creating Arabi Malayalam made it easier for the Arabs who migrated to Kerala to spread the religion without a language barrier getting in the way.

Study center 
The Malayalam University has been set up a centre for studies of Arabi Malayalam language at Tirur.

See also
 Arabi Malayalam script
 Suriyani Malayalam
 Arwi
 Byari bhashe
 Eranadan language
 Jasri

References

Further reading

External links

Languages of India
Dravidian languages
Islamic culture
Mappilas
Arabi Malayalam